Wolfgang Ries (born 1968) is an Austrian amateur astronomer, astrophotographer and discoverer of minor planets.

Ries has his own private observatory at Altschwendt in the Austrian state of Upper Austria. The Minor Planet Center credits him with discovering numerous asteroids since 2004 and 2009.

The main-belt asteroid 266887 Wolfgangries was named after him. Naming citation was published on 22 July 2013.

List of discovered minor planets

References

External links 
 
 

21st-century Austrian astronomers
1968 births
Living people
Discoverers of minor planets